Lanci is an Italian surname. Notable people with the surname include:

 Baldassarre Lanci (1510–1571), Italian inventor
 Giuseppe Lanci (born 1942), Italian cinematographer

See also
 Lance (surname)

 Italian-language surnames